Beautiful Dreamer is a compilation album comprising 18 songs originally penned by Stephen Foster. The album won the Grammy for Best Traditional Folk Album in 2005.

Track listing

References 

2004 compilation albums
Tribute albums
Stephen Foster